Radio DC is a non-commercial community radio administered by the DC School of Management and Technology (DCSMAT). It is the first private FM (frequency modulated) community radio station in Kerala. It is located in KINFRA Film and Video Park, Thiruvananthapuram, Kerala, India. It broadcasts at 90.4 MHz.
All the operations in the radio station are managed by the students of DCSMAT with support from the faculty.

References

External links 
 The official Radio DC website

Radio stations in Kerala
Culture of Thiruvananthapuram
2006 establishments in Kerala
Radio stations established in 2006